Articles (arranged alphabetically) related to Djibouti include:

0-9 
 2008 Ras Doumeira border crisis

A 
 Afro-Asiatic languages
 AfricaPhonebook/Annulaires Afrique

B

C 
 Cush
 Cushitic language

D 
 Djibouti
 Djibouti (city)
 Djibouti Youth Movement

E 
 Economy of Djibouti
 Elections in Djibouti
 Eritrea
 Ethiopia

F

G 
 Geography of Djibouti
 Government of Djibouti

H 
 History of Djibouti
 Horn of Africa

I

J

K

L 
 LGBT rights in Djibouti (Gay rights)
 List of political parties in Djibouti

M

N

O 
 Ogaden

P 
 Politics of Djibouti
 President of Djibouti

Q

R 
 Red Sea

S 
 Saudi Arabia
 Somali language
 Somalia
 Somaliland

T 
 Transport in Djibouti

U

V

W

X

Y 
 Yemen

Z

See also

 Lists of country-related topics - similar lists for other countries

 
Djibouti